A  falling-block action (also known as a sliding-block or dropping-block action) is a single-shot firearm action in which a solid metal breechblock slides vertically in grooves cut into the breech of the weapon and is actuated by a lever.

Description

When the breechblock is in the closed (top) position, it seals the chamber from the high pressures created when the cartridge fires and safely transfers the recoil to the action and stock. When the breechblock is in the lowered position, the rear (breech) end of the chamber is exposed to allow ejection or extraction of the fired case and reloading of an unfired cartridge. It is a very strong action; when the breech is closed, the receiver essentially becomes a single piece of steel (as opposed to other actions which rely on lugs to lock the breech). This type of action is used in heavy artillery as well as small arms. An additional advantage is the unobstructed loading path, which imposes no limit on cartridge length; this was significant in the late-19th century era of very long "buffalo" and "express" big-game cartridges.

Rifles using this action include the M1870 Belgian Comblain, M1872 Mylonas, Sharps rifle, Farquharson rifle, 1890 Stevens, Sharps-Borchardt Model 1878, Winchester Model 1885, Browning model 1885, Browning M78 and Ruger No. 1 & No. 3. Falling-block action military rifles were common in the 19th century. They were replaced for military use by the faster bolt-action rifles, which typically reloaded from a magazine holding several cartridges. A falling block pistol was also produced in 1847 by the French gunsmith Gastinne Renette.

As well as being used for artillery, falling-block action rifles are still manufactured and used for hunting and target shooting and industrial shotguns (8ga) for shooting clinkers in boilers.

The falling-block action is closely related to that of the Martini–Henry rifle, the Peabody action (similar to, but not identical with, that of the Martini–Henry), the Ballard action, and the Madsen–Rasmussen (uniquely, a repeater), which use a pivoting rather than a sliding block.

See also
Bolt action
Lever action
Pump action
Break action
Rolling block
Semi-automatic rifle

References

External links
The Falling Block Action
Yost Single Shot Schuetzen Action

Firearm actions
Firearm components